Matt Cartwright (1961–), U.S. Representative from Pennsylvania's 8th congressional district
John Cartwright (rugby league) (1965–), rugby league footballer, rugby league coach, and Penrith Panthers representative
Bryce Cartwright (1994–), rugby league footballer and Penrith Panthers representative

See also
Cartwright (surname)